Profunditerebra  orientalis is a species of sea snail, a marine gastropod mollusk in the family Terebridae, the auger snails.

Description
The length of the shell attains 35.5 mm.

Distribution
This marine species occurs off New Caledonia and Papua New Guinea.

References

 Aubry U. (1999) Nuove terebre e antichi versi. Ancona: L'Informatore Piceno. 47 pp.

External links
 Fedosov, A. E.; Malcolm, G.; Terryn, Y.; Gorson, J.; Modica, M. V.; Holford, M.; Puillandre, N. (2020). Phylogenetic classification of the family Terebridae (Neogastropoda: Conoidea). Journal of Molluscan Studies
 MNHN, Paris: holotype

Terebridae
Gastropods described in 1999